was a train station located on the Kurihara Den'en Railway Company Kurihara Den'en Railway Line in Kurihara, Miyagi Prefecture, Japan.

Line
Kurihara Den'en Railway Company, Kurihara Den'en Railway Line

History
11 November 1951: Station began operation.
1 April 2007: Station ended operation.

Adjacent stations

Railway stations in Miyagi Prefecture
Kurihara Den'en Railway Line
Defunct railway stations in Japan
Railway stations in Japan opened in 1951
Railway stations closed in 2007